"If You Love Me" is a song performed by American R&B band Mint Condition, issued as the lead single from their fourth studio album Life's Aquarium. The song was produced by the band and written by the band's then-keyboardist Keri Lewis. It was also the first single the band released via Elektra Records, after the dissolution of their previous record label Perspective Records. The song is the band's last entry to date on the Billboard Hot 100, peaking at #30 in 1999.

Charts

Weekly charts

Year-end charts

References

1999 singles
Elektra Records singles
Mint Condition (band) songs
1998 songs
Neo soul songs
Contemporary R&B ballads
1990s ballads